Real World/Road Rules Challenge: The Gauntlet 2 is the 11th season of the MTV reality game show, The Challenge (at the time known as Real World/Road Rules Challenge). 
The season is directly subsequent to The Inferno II.

The Gauntlet II marked T. J. Lavin's first time presenting the series, regularly hosting the program from this season forward. Prior seasons only used temporary hosts. The season is the second in the Gauntlet series, with the original Gauntlet airing in 2003–2004 and The Gauntlet III following in 2008.

The Gauntlet II aired in late 2005 and into 2006 with 32 contestants and took place in Trinidad and Tobago. The teams were designated Veterans and Rookies, based on the number of prior Challenge seasons on which each cast member had competed. Those on the Veterans team had been on at least two prior seasons, and those on the Rookies team had been on fewer than two seasons. For this season, a male and female captain were determined at the beginning of the season. After each team challenge, the losing team captain was sent to the "Gauntlet", where they would face an opponent of the same sex and same team who was voted into the Gauntlet by the respective team. Contestants competed for over $300,000 in rewards.

Contestants

Gameplay

Challenge games
 Royal Rumble: Players, divided by gender and team, are placed on a raft. The last male and female standing for each team are named the captains. Some chose to use rock-paper-scissors to decide who should be the last one standing.
 Winners: Alton, Jo, Ruthie & Adam L.
 Chock Full o' Coconuts: Players must work in pairs to transfer a total of 200 coconuts using bamboo sticks. If they lose coconuts long the way, a player has to pick-up the coconuts. The first team to transfer all of their coconuts in the designated area wins.
 Winners: Rookies
 Team Builders: Teams compete in a series of tasks to complete in order. The first team to advance all of their players through the obstacle course wins.
 Team Bridge: Players are provided with tires and wooden boards, that they must use to get to the second station without touching the ground. If a player touches the ground, the whole team has to start over.
 Up and Over: With the help of a wooden board, players must go over a suspended rope without touching it. If a player touches the rope, the whole team has to start over.
 Carry the Load: Players must carry a ball up and down a hill without using their hands.
 Winners: Veterans
 Moving Pyramid: Both teams must form human pyramids with three people on the bottom, two in the middle and one on top. In pyramid formation, they must crawl through a course and retrieve a total on 16 flags on top of poles, every team member must be on top at some point during the challenge. The team with the most flags after 1 hour wins. In the event of a tie, the teams must race through the course in pyramid formation and the fastest team wins.
 Winners: Veterans
 Sponge Worthy: Players divide themselves in three categories: Soakers, Transferers, and Collectors. Spongers collect water directly from the ocean with a sponge on their body, they then pass it on the Transferers with the help of a second sponge. Collectors must then squeeze the sponge on the Transferers without using their hands. The first team to collect a certain amount of water wins.
 Winners: Rookies
 Body Painters: Wearing a speedo, the players must use their body to completely cover six canvases in different colors. The fastest team wins.
 Winners: Veterans
 Rickshaw Races: Teams must complete a total of six laps and transfer all of their players in a rickshaw using only six drivers (three males and three females. The fastest team wins.
 Winners: Rookies
 Team Strength: Teams selects two Pushers and one Driver to move a truck through a course. The back of the truck is then filled with cinder blocks and pushed back to the starting point. The fastest team wins.
 Winners: Rookies
 Balancing Act: Working in pairs, teams must balance on two parallel ropes using another piece or rope held by the pairs. The team with the most players to successfully complete the course wins.
 Winners: Rookies
 Buck-a-neer: Alternating in both positions, one team must balance on barrells connected to ropes without using hands while the other team tries to make them fall pulling the ropes. The team with the most players standing at the end of the challenge wins.
 Winners: Rookies

Gauntlet games
Name That Coconut: Players compete for the coconut with the name of the person that is the answer to a Real World/Road Rules trivia question. If the answer is wrong, the other player can answer freely.
Played 3 Times: Derrick vs. Adam L., Kina vs. Cara, Derrick vs. Brad
Beach Brawl: Players have to wrestle their opponent out of a ring.
Played 4 Times: Alton vs. Danny, Derrick vs. Ace, Derrick vs. Syrus, Aneesa vs. Beth
Capture the Flag: Players have to climb up a 20-foot (approx. 6 meters) rope net to get a flag.
Played 3 Times: Kina vs. Cameran, Alton vs. Adam K., Alton vs. Jeremy
Reverse Tug of War: Players are tied to each other, facing opposite directions. The first to get to their flag wins.
Played 4 Times: Ruthie vs. Jisela, Beth vs. Ruthie, Beth vs. Montana, Timmy vs. Derrick
Sticky Situation: Players had to stick balls to a board as their opponent tries to stop them.
Played 1 Time: Kina vs. Jillian
Knock Off: The wheel never landed on this challenge; the rules and gameplay of the challenge are unknown.
Other spaces on the wheel
Spin Again: If a Gauntlet challenge was done 3 times, the next time there is a Gauntlet, that challenge is taken off the wheel for that instance and is replaced by Spin Again.
Captain's Choice: The captain of the team going into the Gauntlet will choose which challenge he or she will be doing.
Challenger's Choice: The person the team chose to oppose the captain in the Gauntlet will choose which challenge he or she will be doing.

Game summary

Gauntlet progress
{|
|- valign="top"
|

Teams
 The contestant is on the Rookies team
 The contestant is on the Veterans team
Competition
 The contestant's team won by default after the other team forfeited
 The contestant's team forfeited after determining they weren't going to win
 The contestant's team won the challenge and was safe
 The contestant won the Captain's challenge and was named the team captain
 The contestant sat out of the challenge and the contestant's team won the challenge
 The contestant sat out of the challenge and was exempt from the Gauntlet
 The contestant won the Gauntlet
 The contestant was selected for the Gauntlet, but did not have to compete
 The contestant lost the Gauntlet and was eliminated
 The contestant withdrew from the competition

The final challenge
The final challenge, "Bet Your Booty" consisted of three games, roti eating, a memory challenge, and a relay race, to place bets on after receiving 250 gold doubloons each from the host, T. J. Lavin, with each contestant eligible to compete in only one event. The Veterans bet and lost the majority of their doubloons on the first round and afterwards gave up letting the Rookies win the $240,000 final prize to split.

Episodes

Reunion special
The reunion special, Shark Infested Waters: Gauntlet II Reunion, aired after the season finale on March 27, 2006 and was hosted by Susie Castillo.

Teams/Pairs

Notes

References

External links 
 Official site
 MTV's official Real World website
 MTV's official Road Rules website

Gauntlet 2
Television shows filmed in Trinidad and Tobago
2005 American television seasons
2006 American television seasons